Gimme a Break! is an American television sitcom created by Mort Lachman and Sy Rosen, that aired on NBC for six seasons from October 29, 1981, to May 12, 1987. The series starred Nell Carter as the housekeeper for a widowed police chief (Dolph Sweet) and his three daughters.

Cast

Main characters
Nell Carter as Nellie Ruth "Nell" Harper
Dolph Sweet as Carl Kanisky (seasons 1-4)
Kari Michaelsen as Kathleen "Katie" Kanisky (seasons 1-5)
Lauri Hendler as Julie Kanisky Maxwell (seasons 1-5)
Lara Jill Miller as Samantha "Sam" Kanisky (seasons 1-5, recurring season 6)
John Hoyt as Stanley Kanisky (seasons 2-6, previously recurring)
Joey Lawrence as Joey Donovan (seasons 3-6)
Howard Morton as Ralph Waldo Simpson (seasons 3-5, previously recurring)
Telma Hopkins as Dr. Adelaide "Addy" Wilson (seasons 4-6, previously recurring)
Jonathan Silverman as Jonathan Maxwell (season 5, previously recurring)w
Rosetta LeNoire as Maybelle Harper (season 6, previously recurring)
Matthew Lawrence as Matthew Donovan (season 6)
Rosie O'Donnell as Maggie O'Brien (season 6)
Paul Sand as Marty (season 6)

Recurring characters

Lynne Thigpen as Loretta Harper 
Alvernette Jimenez as Angie McDaniel
Elvia Allman (Season 1, Episode 11), Elizabeth Kerr (Season 1, Episode 15), and Jane Dulo (Season 2) as Mildred Kanisky (née Wuchetzky)
Pete Schrum as Ed Kanisky
Patrick Collins as Tim Donovan
Jack Fletcher as Erwin J. Swackhammer
Harrison Page as Hamilton Storm

Broadcast history

Episodes

Production
The show was produced by Alan Landsburg Productions (renamed as Reeves Entertainment Group in 1985). The US syndication rights are held by NBCUniversal Television Distribution, the successor company to original syndicator MCA TV. FremantleMedia owns the international rights, as they own Thames Television, which acquired Reeves Entertainment Group in 1990. The creators of the show were Mort Lachman and Sy Rosen. The series was taped at Metromedia Square in Hollywood before a studio audience.

Over its run, the series used two different theme songs. The first was composed by Bob Christianson with lyrics by Bob Garrett and Marley Sims; two versions of this song were used, one for the first season and a new recording for the second. A new theme, with music by Jay Graydon and lyrics by Richard Page, was introduced in the third season and used for the remainder of the show's run. The new theme has similarities to the first but with a more positive attitude. Carter performed both themes.

Carter distanced herself from the show following its run. “I don't want to go to my grave being known as the girl from 'Gimme a Break,’” she told The New York Times in 1988. “That wasn't me; it was just a job.”

Reception
The show received mixed reviews from critics when it premiered. Writing for the Washington Post, Tom Shales wrote an especially scathing review of the pilot episode. “I wish I could sue NBC for the grievous consternation, intestinal distress and aggravated low moaning I have suffered as a result of ‘Gimme a Break,’” Shales wrote, going on to criticize the show’s sex jokes and what he found to be the racial stereotypes embodied by Carter’s character. “If I thought television could get substantially worse than this, I am not sure I would have the courage or desire ever to turn the set on again,” Shales concluded. 

By contrast, the New York Times found the show promising, praising the performances of Carter and Sweet and the way the show balanced wisecracks with bits of seriousness.  “The abrupt changes in tone are handled adroitly,” John J. O’Connor wrote. “Given some supportive scripts, Miss Carter and Mr. Sweet could insure a good run for this series.”

Syndication
The show has been in syndication since 1985. Reruns have also aired nationally on WWOR EMI Service and USA. Distribution rights are jointly owned by The Program Exchange and NBCUniversal Television Distribution, successor in interest to previous syndicator MCA Television. Reruns of the series are a mainstay of many of Sinclair Broadcast Group's The CW, MeTV and MyNetworkTV stations, especially in low-traffic time periods, due to the low-cost barter setup of The Program Exchange. 

Antenna TV aired the show from January 2, 2018 until December 31, 2021.
Cozi TV started airing the show as of January 3, 2022.

Streaming

Tubi acquired all seasons of the show as of February 1, 2022.

Home media

Canada
Visual Entertainment (under license from FremantleMedia) released the first two seasons of Gimme a Break! on DVD in Canada between 2006–07. In 2009, VEI announced that they plan on releasing the entire series in a complete series box set in 2010.  VEI released Gimme a Break! The Complete Series on DVD in Canada on July 20, 2010.

Awards and nominations
Nell Carter received two Emmy nominations as Best Actress in a Comedy Series. and two Golden Globe nominations as Best Actress in a Television Series-Comedy or Musical.

References

External links
 

1980s American black sitcoms
1980s American sitcoms
1981 American television series debuts
1987 American television series endings
English-language television shows
NBC original programming
Television series about families
Television series by Alan Landsburg Productions
Television series by Universal Television
Television shows set in Los Angeles